Edward Randolph (1690–after 1756) was a ship captain and London tobacco merchant.

Edward Randolph is also the name of:

Edward Randolph (colonial administrator) (1632–1703), English colonial administrator
Edward Randolph (soldier) (died 1566), English soldier
Edward H. Randolph (1858–1934), American lawyer from Louisiana
Ned Randolph (1942–2016), Louisiana congressman

See also